Esteban Adame is an East Los Angeles DJ who emerged from the Chicano/Latino rave or party scene in the 1990s. He started DJing at the age of 15. In 2004, he was asked by "Mad" Mike Banks of Underground Resistance to join the music collective in Detroit, Michigan. Banks reportedly was interested when he "found out Chicanos from Southern California were interested in UR records, sensing a common ground between Los Angeles's Latino enclaves and the Black neighborhoods of Detroit." Adame would go on to play piano for the label's electronic jazz band Galaxy 2 Galaxy.

In 2006, he founded label Ican with Santiago Salazar and has released multiple productions for the label. He has collaborated with Nomadico, who he formed the group El Coyote with, as well as DJ 3000. In 2019, he and Nomadico played the Carnaval De Bahidorá festival in Mexico. Adame also releases music under the name Frequencia, which has been described as the experimental and "darker side of his productions."

Discography

Albums 

 Day Labor (2014)

Singles & EPs 

 Unofficial Discourse (2018)
 Mayan Basement EP (2018)
 Angeleno EP (2018) w/ Santiago Salazar
 Mextli EP (2017)
 Descendants EP (2017)
 Notice This EP (2014) w/ Nef Nunez
 Brown Dream EP (2013)
 Determinacion EP (2011)
 East Los Luv EP (2011)

References

External links 
 Esteban Adame via Discogs

American techno musicians
American electronic musicians
American DJs
Chicano
Club DJs
Electronic dance music DJs
Living people
Year of birth missing (living people)